The New England Biotech Association (NEBA) is a coalition of biotechnology companies, academic institutions, pharmaceutical companies, and trade organizations from all six New England States.

NEBA serves as a regional policy and public affairs voice for the biotechnology and biopharmaceutical industry.

NEBA is a non-profit, member driven organization, with over 600 members.

The Chairman of NEBA is Paul Pescatello, Director of Connecticut United for Research Excellence -(CURE.) 

In 2010, NEBA advocated against measures that would harm the biotechnology industry in Maine  and other New England states.  The organization also launched a website www.MassRxHelp.org to help consumers save money on prescription medications.

External links
 Official web site

References

Biotechnology organizations
Non-profit organizations based in Massachusetts